Smoke is a cloud of particles suspended in the air. The term may also refer to:

Places
 Mountain of Smoke (Arabic: جبل الدخان, Jabal ad Dukhan), a hill in Bahrain
 Smoke Lake (disambiguation), various lakes in Canada and the USA
 "The Smoke", a nickname for London

People
 Smoke (surname), a list of people
 John Smoke Johnson (1792–1886), a Mohawk leader in Canada, also known as Smoke Johnson
 Smoke Laval (born 1955), American college baseball coach
 Sayenqueraghta (c. 1707–1786), Seneca war chief nicknamed "Old Smoke"
 Old Chief Smoke (1774–1864), an original Oglala Sioux head chief
 Tony Stewart (born 1971), American auto racer nicknamed "Smoke"

Arts and entertainment

Characters
 Smoke (comics), in the Marvel Comics universe
 Smoke (Mortal Kombat), from the Mortal Kombat video game franchise
"Big Smoke", a friend of Carl Johnson in Grand Theft Auto: San Andreas

Films
 Smoke (film), a 1995 American independent film
 The Smoke (film), a 2014 British crime thriller

Television
 The Smoke (TV series), a 2014 British drama series
 "Smoke" (Better Call Saul), a 2018 episode of the television series Better Call Saul

Literature
 Smoke (Turgenev novel), an 1867 novel by Ivan Turgenev
 Smoke (Miscione novel), a 2004 novel by Lisa Miscione

Music

Groups
 Smoke (American band), a 1990s band based in Atlanta, Georgia
 The Smoke, a pop band from York from the 1960s and 1970s

Albums
 Smoke (Paul Kelly album) (1999)
 Smoke (White Williams album) (2007)
 Smoke (Izzy Stradlin album) (2009)
 Smoke (Lisa Lois album) (2009)
 Smoke (Alexander von Schlippenbach and Sunny Murray album) (1990)

Songs
 "Smoke" (Eskimo Joe song) (2004)
 "Smoke" (Natalie Imbruglia song) (1998)
 "Smoke" (A Thousand Horses song) (2015)
 "Smoke" (50 Cent song), a 2014 song featuring Trey Songz
 "Smoke", a 2014 song from White Noise by Pvris
 "Smoke", a song from Whatever and Ever Amen by Ben Folds Five
 "Smoke", a song from Red Earth by Crash Vegas
 "Smoke", a song from Growing Pains by Mary J. Blige
 "Smoke! Smoke! Smoke! (That Cigarette)",  a Western swing novelty song
 "The Smoke", a song by Amorphis

Other
 Smoke (1/3), a sculpture by Tony Smith
 Ad-Dukhan ("Smoke"), the 44th chapter (sura) of the Quran

Computing and technology
 Smoke (software), an editing and effects software for the arts, media and entertainment industry
 Autodesk Smoke

Sports
 Asheville Smoke, a United Hockey League team from 1998 to 2000, based in Asheville, North Carolina, USA
 Brantford Smoke, a Colonial Hockey League, later United Hockey League team from 1991 to 1998, based in Brantford, Ontario, Canada, before relocating to Asheville

Other uses
 Smoke (jazz club), a jazz club in Manhattan, New York
 Smoke, slang for a cigarette
 Smoke, historic derogatory slang for Negro
 Smoke, slang verb meaning "to murder" or "to beat" in a competition
 Smoke Squadron, popular name of the Brazilian Air Force's air demonstration squadron
 Smoke, a fur color for cats

See also
 Smokey (disambiguation)
 Smokie (disambiguation)
 Smoking (disambiguation)
 Smoky (disambiguation)
 Smoke's Poutinerie